The Mondesir Heir (French: L'héritier des Mondésir) is a 1940 French-German comedy film directed by Albert Valentin and starring Fernandel, Elvire Popesco and Jules Berry. It was shot in Berlin by the German studio UFA in a co-production arrangement with its own French subsidiary ACE. Made before the Second World War broke out, it was the last of twenty one such productions.

Cast
 Fernandel as Bienaimé de Mondésir, le baron de Mondésir & ses aïeux 
 Elvire Popesco as Erika Axelos  
 Jules Berry as Waldemar  
 Gaby André as Janine Richard - La postière 
 Monette Dinay as Rosette  
 Jacques Derives as L'ordonnateur  
 Yves Deniaud as Gaston  
 Hugues Wanner as Lepetit  
 Henri Beaulieu as Le colonel  
 Lucien Dayle as Le notaire  
 Marfa d'Hervilly as La cliente de Waldemer 
 Fernand Flament as Martinot  
 Frédéric Mariotti as Costecalde  
 Edmond Ardisson as Justin - Le chauffeur  
 Simone Gauthier as La première jeune fille du ciel 
 Édouard Delmont as Firmin - Le majordome des Mondésir  
 Tramel as Le curé 
 Mathilde Alberti as Madame Cassard  
 Bill Bocket as Le vitrier 
 Jacques B. Brunius as Le médecin  
 Ketti Dallan as Ginette  
 Paul Denneville as Le marchand de cycles  
 Marthe Derminy as Madame Février-Mars  
 Drejac as Le fils du marchand  
 Odile Dufay as Mademoiselle de Picoult  
 Jacqueline Dufranne as Marguerite  
 Suzy Flory as La commère 
 Paul Fournier as Le bistro  
 Sonia Gobar as Lucette  
 Philippe Grey as Max  
 Denise Helia as Gaby 
 Elyane Herenguel as La deuxième jeune fille du ciel 
 Anna Lefeuvrier as Irma  
 Palmyre Levasseur as La patronne du bistro 
 Jeanne Longuet as Raymonde  
 Marcelly as L'épicière  
 Jany Marsa as La voisine 
 I. Mense as L'ami  
 Auguste Mouriès as Quatrefages  
 Léo Mouriès as Madame Costecalde  
 Robert Ozanne as Petit rôle 
 Roger Peter as Xavier  
 Rocca as Le petit vieux  
 André Saint-Germain as Chabernac  
 Georges Serrano as Petit rôle 
 Rita Stoya as Clara  
 Solange Vallée as Mado 
 Jacques Valois as Jimmy  
 Ernest Varial as Le charron

References

Bibliography 
 Fiss, Karen. Grand Illusion: The Third Reich, the Paris Exposition, and the Cultural Seduction of France. University of Chicago Press, 2009.

External links 
 

1940 films
1940 comedy films
French comedy films
German comedy films
1940s French-language films
UFA GmbH films
Films with screenplays by Jean Aurenche
Films with screenplays by Pierre Bost
German black-and-white films
French black-and-white films
1940s French films